Otto I (24 August 1390 – 5 July 1461) was the Count Palatine of Mosbach from 1410 until 1448, and the Count Palatine of Mosbach-Neumarkt from 1448 until 1461.

Life

Otto was born in Mosbach in 1390 as the youngest son of Rupert III of the Palatinate, King of Germany. In 1410 after the death of his father, the territories of the Palatinate were divided between his four sons; Otto received the territory around Mosbach and Eberbach. He made Mosbach his capital and began the construction of a new residence there. Otto became the regent of the Electorate of the Palatinate and guardian of his nephew Louis IV after his brother Louis III returned from a pilgrimage to Jerusalem seriously ill and died soon after. He held the regency until 1442.

In 1448 he inherited half of the territory of the extinct Palatinate-Neumarkt line and purchased the other half from his brother Stephen, and he also established a residence in Neumarkt. Otto died in Reichenbach in 1461 and was buried in the Benedictine Reichenbach Abbey.

Marriage
Otto married Joanna of Bavaria-Landshut (1413 - 20 July 1444), daughter of duke Henry XVI in January 1430 and had the following children:
Margaret (2 March 1432 - 14 September 1457)
Amalie (22 February 1433 - 5 December 1488)
Otto (26 June 1435 - 8 April 1499)
Rupert (25 November 1437 - 1 November 1465)
Dorothea (24 August 1439 - 15 May 1482) Prioress in the Liebenau monastery
Albert (6 September 1440 -  20 August 1506)
Anne (1441 - ?) Prioress in the Himmelskron monastery
John (1 August 1443 - 4 October 1486)
Barbara (July 1444 - ?) Nun in the Liebenau monastery near Worms

1390 births
1461 deaths
House of Wittelsbach
Medieval Knights of the Holy Sepulchre
Sons of kings